Claudio Delgado (born 21 June 1984) is a Paraguayan former footballer.

He has played for Santiago Morning, Cobreloa, 2 de Mayo, among others.

References
 Profile at BDFA 
 

1984 births
Living people
Paraguayan footballers
Paraguayan expatriate footballers
Deportes Concepción (Chile) footballers
Santiago Morning footballers
Cobreloa footballers
2 de Mayo footballers
Sportivo Carapeguá footballers
Cerro Porteño (Presidente Franco) footballers
Primera B de Chile players
Chilean Primera División players
Expatriate footballers in Chile
Association football forwards